The Paraibuna River is a river of São Paulo state in southeastern Brazil. It is a tributary of the Paraíba do Sul.

The headwaters are protected by the  Mananciais do Rio Paraíba do Sul Environmental Protection Area, created in 1982 to protect the sources of the Paraíba do Sul river.

See also
List of rivers of São Paulo

References

Brazilian Ministry of Transport

Rivers of São Paulo (state)